Harold Kainalu Long Castle (July 3, 1886 – August 19, 1967) was a landowner, real estate developer, and later philanthropist in Hawaii.

Life
Harold Kainalu Long Castle was born July 3, 1886, in Honolulu.
Castle was the son of wealthy landowner James Bicknell Castle and Julia White, and grandson of Castle & Cooke founder Samuel Northrup Castle and philanthropist Mary Tenney Castle. In 1917, he purchased almost  of land on the windward side of the island of Oahu, in what was then the ahupuaa of Kailua, to start his sprawling Kaneohe Ranch.

In 1962, he set up the Harold K.L. Castle Foundation, which remains the largest private foundation based in Hawaii. He and his foundation have donated large amounts of land to educational and other public institutions, among them Hawaii Loa College, ʻIolani School, Castle High School, Kainalu Elementary School, Castle Medical Center, and the Mokapu peninsula land that became Marine Corps Base Hawaii.

He and his wife, Alice Hedemann, both graduated from Punahou School, he served on its Board of Trustees (1922–1937), and their descendants have continued to attend and support the school.

Plantation Estate, his home in Kailua, Honolulu County, Hawaii, has been used by Barack Obama as a Winter White House during Christmas vacations in 2008, 2009, and 2010.

Family tree

See also
Kaneohe Ranch
Harold K.L. Castle Foundation
James B. Castle High School
Hawaii Loa College
Kawai Nui Marsh

References

External links
Kaneohe Ranch Management Limited
Harold K.L. Castle Foundation

People from Hawaii
1886 births
1967 deaths
20th-century American philanthropists